Zelinkaderidae is a family of worms belonging to the class Cyclorhagida.

Genera:
 Triodontoderes Sørensen & Rho, 2009
 Zelinkaderes Higgins, 1990

References

Kinorhyncha